Merda may refer to:

 The Latin word for excrement, used as a swear word in various languages
 Marda, Salfit, old Western name of this West Bank village
 Charles-André Merda, French soldier
 Łukasz Merda, Polish football goalkeeper